Česká Skalice is a town in Náchod District in the Hradec Králové Region of the Czech Republic. It has about 4,900 inhabitants.

Administrative parts
Town parts and villages of Malá Skalice, Ratibořice, Spyta, Zájezd and Zlíč are administrative parts of Česká Skalice.

Geography
It lies in the Orlice Table. The town is situated on the river Úpa. The Grandmother's Valley along the river is protected as a national nature monument. Part of Rozkoš Reservoir, on whose shores the town lies, lies in the municipal territory.

History
In Chronica Boemorum there is mentioned a trade route from Bohemia to Poland through this area in the 11th century. In the early 13th century, two settlement with fortresses were founded near this route and named Malá Skalice and Velká Skalice. In 1490, they are first referred to as one village named Česká Skalice. In 1504, Česká Skalice was promoted to a market town and in 1575, it was promoted to a town.

In the 19th century, the town was industrialized and textile factories were established.

Demographics

Sights
The town is visited for its connection with life and work of Božena Němcová, who belongs among the most impactful Czech writers. The best-known places are Ratibořice Castle and Grandmother's Valley.

In Malá Skalice is Museum of Božena Němcová. Until 2017 there was Textile Museum as well but it was closed and the exposition was moved to nearby Dvůr Králové nad Labem.

Notable people
František Rint, 19th-century woodcarver
Božena Němcová (1820–1862), writer; lived here
Charlotte of Schaumburg-Lippe (1864–1946), German princess
Frederick of Schaumburg-Lippe (1868–1945), German prince
Bathildis of Schaumburg-Lippe (1873–1962), German princess
Adelaide of Schaumburg-Lippe (1875–1971), German princess

Twin towns – sister cities

Česká Skalice is twinned with:
 Bardo, Poland
 Liptovský Hrádok, Slovakia
 Polanica-Zdrój, Poland
 Rüschlikon, Switzerland
 Warrington, England, United Kingdom

References

External links

Cities and towns in the Czech Republic
Populated places in Náchod District